Maxut Zhumayev (born December 23, 1976) is a Kazakhstani mountaineer who climbed all fourteen of the world's eight-thousander peaks (i.e. mountains above 8,000 metres), and without the use of supplementary oxygen. Zhumayev was the 26th person to complete this feat in history, and the 12th person to do so without the use of supplementary oxygen. Later, he founded the Kazakh Alpine Club.

References

Living people
1977 births
Kazakhstani mountain climbers
Summiters of all 14 eight-thousanders